Quimby House may refer to:

Howe-Quimby House, Hopkinton, New Hampshire, listed on the National Register of Historic Places in Merrimack County, New Hampshire
Dr. Samuel Quimby House, Mount Vernon, Maine, listed on the National Register of Historic Places in Kennebec County, Maine